is a town located in Tokachi Subprefecture, Hokkaido, Japan.

As of September 2016, the town had an estimated population of 6,234 and a density of 24 persons per km2. The total area is 259.13 km2.

Mascot

He is an joyful and dynamic blue alien. He is shaped like a "shi" (士). His gooey body contains a pink heart representing love, a yellow star for hope and dreams, a white mountain symbolizing the Nupukaushi-nupuri mountain range and a green tree representing nature. Enthusiasm and harmonious development is his goal. In other versions, he is depicted as a young human boy.

References

External links

Official Website 

Towns in Hokkaido